= FTH: K Visual Theatre =

FTH:K (From The Hip: Khulumakahle) is a visual theatre and education company based in Cape Town, South Africa, which is unusual for its development of Deaf and hearing performers. It is currently training South Africa's first generation of deaf practitioners for inclusion in the theatre industry and has toured South Africa, Germany and Argentina and the USA. Productions include Pictures of You, QUACK!, GUMBO! and Womb Tide.

Tanya Surtees, fellow of the John F. Kennedy Centre for the Performing Arts in Washington, is director, choreographer, educator and more.
